The School of Social Work Roshni Nilaya, managed by the Institute of Social Service Mangalore of Karnataka State. It believes in the dictum – "Small is Beautiful". It is situated on a six-acre campus, wherein besides the college of social work, there are service centers such as Kindergarten, Family Service Agency, Family Counselling Centre and CHILDLINE.
The Institute has adopted as its motto, the words of Tagore – "LOVE IS MADE FRUITFUL IN SERVICE"- Serving God by serving human persons is the principle that guides its action.

History

Established in 1960 in Mangalore by the Society of Daughters of the Heart of Mary, an International Catholic Religious Society, founded in France in 1790 during the French Revolution. It is the first and a pioneer Post Graduate Centre for Social Work Education in Karnataka.

Current
The College was affiliated to Mangalore University, becoming Autonomous from 2007. The NATIONAL ASSESSMENT AND ACCREDITATION COUNCIL (NAAC) established by the University Grants Commission (UGC) of India, to assess and accredit institutions of higher education in the country, has  Re-Accredited the college at the ‘A’ level and the institution celebrated 75 years of Social Work Education in India

Library & research centers 
ADELAIDE LIBRARY has separate floors for the Undergraduate and Post graduate Departments with a separate section for the Doctoral students. E learning facility is provided in the library. It has 31,965 books, 103 Subscribed Journals. It also have a documentation centre with files of Seminar Papers, Audio-visuals and News Paper clippings.
The College has a separate Department of Research with a specially trained person on Research Methodology and Statistics to undertake sponsored research projects and to provide technical guidance to research scholars and to students. The department of research has taken up studies and successfully completed several research projects for the Government of India, State Governments, University, Industries, Banks, NGOs and Health Care Institutions.

References

Mangalore University